Antonello Matarazzo is an exponent of Medialismo, an Italian movement that postulate different media interaction. He has been engaged in his personal search concerning the visual arts, combining moving pictures with "still" ones, shifting from film-making to paintings and realizing video installations and video projections in galleries, museums and festivals in Italy and outside since 1990.

Since 2000, the year of his debut video, The Fable, a short film produced and broadcast by Fuori Orario (Raitre), he has taken part in many national and international festivals, such as the Venice Film Festival, Festival Cinéma Méditerranéen Montpellier, Rome Film Fest, Torino Film Festival, Festival international du film sur l'art de Montréal, Mar del Plata Film Festival and the Locarno International Film Festival), receiving many prizes and rave reviews. Some of the most famous Italian jet set personalities, like the film critic Enrico Ghezzi  and the actress Piera Degli Esposti  starred in his artistic films. In 2006, a whole retrospective of his works took place within the 42° Mostra Internazionale del Nuovo Cinema di Pesaro.

Sources

Enciclopedias 
 Enciclopedia dell'Arte Zanichelli, Zanichelli editore, Bologna 2004 
 Cinema italiano, a cura di Stefano Della Casa, editrice il Castoro, Milano 2004

Books 
 Videofusion1 – Gabriele Perretta. Stampa Alternativa / Nuovi Equilibri edition, Roma 2007
 Miserere - Andrea Cortellessa, Gabriele Perretta. Squilibri Editore, Roma 2006 
 Neotelevisione - Marcello Pecchioli. Edizioni Costa & Nolan, Milano 2006 
 I mestieri di Ergon - Gabriele Perretta. Edizioni Mimesis, Milano 2005 
 Media.comm(unity)/comm.medium - Gabriele Perretta. Edizioni Mimesis, Milano 2004

Catalogues 
 Invideo 2007. Poetroniche – Elena Marcheschi. Mimesis Edizioni, Milano 2007 
 p. I.T.t.u.r.a. (ipotesi figurative italiane) - Gianluca Marziani. Edizioni StudioSei, Milano 2006
 Milano doc Festival 2007 - Bruno Di Marino, Claudio Strinati. Edizioni Doc Fest, Roma 2007
 Invideo 2005. A rovescio – Sandra Lischi, Elena Marcheschi. Revolver edition, Bologna 2005 
 Antonello Matarazzo: Steak&Steel - Alfonso Amendola, Gabriele Perretta. International Printing Editore, Avellino 2005 
 BovArchè - Meridiani d'Oriente - Gabriele Perretta. Liriti Editore, Reggio Calabria 2004
 XI Biennale d'Arte Sacra - Maria Luisa Caffarelli. Edizioni Staurós di S. Gabriele, Isola del Gran Sasso TE 2004
 Antonello Matarazzo - Enrico Ghezzi, Marisa Vescovo. Edizioni Studio Vigato, Alessandria 2003
 Laboratorio Politico di Fine Secolo - Gabriele Perretta. Edizioni Dell'Ortica, Bologna 1997
 Aperto Italia '97 - Simona Barucco. Giancarlo Politi Editore, Milano 1997

Exhibitions 

2008 
Project 59, edited by Irina Danilova, organized by Jade Walker, Creative Research Laboratory, The University of Texas at Austin, Austin, Texas (USA)
Project 59, edited by Irina Danilova, organized by Laura Conchelos, B1 Lounge, South Pole / The University of Southern Maine, Portland (ME)
2007 
Project 59, edited by Irina Danilova, organized by Karl Lind – Gallery Homeland, Portland, Oregon (USA)
Made in Italy - Genius Loci, edited by Bruno Roberti / Archivio Raro video, edited by Bruno Di Marino – Filmstudio, Roma
Attori/Spettatori, edited by Raffaele Curi, Bruno Di Marino – Fondazione Alda Fendi, Roma
Project 59, organized by Tamara Alexandrovna Galeyeva – Center of Contemporary Culture, The Urals State University, Yekaterinburg (RUS)
Project 59, edited by Irina Danilova – OkNo Gallery, Chelyabinsk (RUS)
La posa infinita (solo exhibition), coordinated by Milano Doc Festival – Museo Nazionale della Scienza e della Tecnologia 'Leonardo da Vinci', Milano
Project 59, edited by Irina Danilova – The Galaxie, Doc Films / University of Chicago, Chicago (USA)
Interreg III C - Noè, edited by Simona Isgrò, Valentina Valerio – Conseil de la Région PACA office, Marsiglia (FR)
Miserere, edited by Canio Loguercio – PAN (Palazzo delle Arti), Napoli
2006 
Miserere, edited by Canio Loguercio – Basilica di S. Maria in Ara Coeli, Roma
10 secondi (solo exhibition), coordinated by Fondazione RomaEuropa – Teatro Palladium, Roma
4° International Designexpo - Transversalità, edited by Federica Dal Falco, Antonella Greco – Ex Magazzini Generali, Roma
22nd Art Amsterdam (solo exhibition), stand StudioSei Arte Contemporanea – Amsterdam Art Fair exhibition pavilions, Amsterdam (NL)
Phoenix, A transformative Multi Media Co-creation, coordinated by Bayennale 2006 – Ghost Town Galleries, Oakland - California (USA)
Video On/On Video, edited by Bruno Di Marino – Arte Parma exhibition pavilions, Parma
p. I.T.t.u.r.a. (ipotesi figurative italiane), edited by Gianluca Marziani – StudioSei Arte Contemporanea, Milano
Arco, stand Changing Role-Move Over Gallery – Arco exhibition pavilions, Madrid (SP)
2005 
Fujiyama vs. Vesuvio (videoretrospective), edited by Alfonso Amendola, Antonello Tolve – Villa Campolieto, Ercolano NA
2004 
XI Biennale d'Arte Sacra, edited by Carlo Chenis, Marisa Vescovo – Museo Staurós d'Arte Sacra Contemporanea, Isola del Gran Sasso TE
BovArchè - Meridiani d'Oriente (Venice Biennale circuit), edited by Gabriele Perretta – Palazzo Mesiani, Bova RC
Media.comm(unity)/comm.medium, edited by Gabriele Perretta – Masedu-Museo d'Arte Contemporanea, Sassari
2003 
Testimoni per caso (solo exhibition), testi di Enrico Ghezzi, Marisa Vescovo – Studio Vigato, Alessandria
Imago Mentis, edited by Gabriele Perretta – galleria Romberg, Latina / galleria La Giarina, Verona
[...] 1997 
Aperto '97, edited by Simona Barucco, organized by Flash Art – Trevi Flash Art Museum, Trevi PG
[...] 1991 
Matarazzo-Miro-Sabatello, edited by Giuseppe Selvaggi – Museo Trasporti, Budapest (H)

Film Festivals 

2007 
9. Festival des Cinémas Différents de Paris, Parigi (F)
17. InVideo Mostra Internazionale di Video e Cinema oltre, Spazio Oberdan, Milano
2. Rome Film Festival, Roma
60. Locarno International Film Festival, Locarno (CH)
17. Festival Cinema Africano, d'Asia e America Latina, Milano
22. Mar del Plata Film Festival, Buenos Aires (RA)
2006 
11. Roma Film Festival, (Eventi/Etrange), Roma
42. Mostra Internazionale del Nuovo Cinema, (retrospective), Pesaro.
Reggio Calabria Film Festival, (retrospective), Reggio Calabria
24. Festival International du Film sur l'Art (FIFA), Montréal (CDN)
Festival International de Film et Vidéo de Création, Beirut (RL)
2005 
15. InVideo Mostra Internazionale di Video e Cinema oltre, Spazio Oberdan, Milano
27. Festival International Cinéma Méditerranéen Montpellier, Montpellier (F)
62. Venice International Film Festival, Venezia
8. Expresión en Corto, Guanajuato (MEX)
41. Mostra Internazionale del Nuovo Cinema, Pesaro
Festival d'Arte di Palazzo Venezia, (Nuovi linguaggi), Roma • 1° Price 
2004 
22. Torino Film Festival, (Spazio Italia), Torino
26. Festival International Cinéma Méditerranéen Montpellier, Montpellier (F)
7. 'O Curt, Institut Française Le Grenoble, Napoli
International Film Festival of Fine Art, Szolnok (H)
7. Expresión en Corto, Guanajuato (MEX)
12. Arcipelago, (E-Movie), Roma • Special Mention 
2003 
21. Torino Film Festival, (Spazio Italia), Torino
11. Arcipelago, (Corto.web), Roma • 1° Price 
21. Bellaria Film Festival, (Anteprima), Bellaria RN
2002 
20. Torino Film Festival, (Spazio Italia), Torino
2001 
19. Bellaria Film Festival, (Anteprima), Bellaria RN
2000
18. Bellaria Film Festival, (Anteprima), Bellaria RN

Video-filmography 

4B movie ( © 2007 col. DVcam 5' )
La posa infinita ( © 2007 b/w DVcam 3 video 1' loop cad)
Luna Zero ( © 2007 col. DVcam 10' )
Mummy ( © 2007 col. DVcam 3' loop )
tribal TRIBAL ( © 2007 col. DVcam 3' )
Piera e gli assassini ( © 2007 col. DVcam 6' )
9 06 83 ( © 2006 col. DVcam 4' )
Interferenze ( © 2006 col. DVcam 30' )
En plain air ( © 2005 col. DVcam 10' )
Miserere (cantus) ( © 2005 col. DVcam 8' )
Lovers ( © 2004 col. DVcam 24'' )
Apice ( © 2004 col. DVcam 6' )
A Sua immagine ( © 2004 col. DVcam 3' )
Miserere ( © 2004 col. DVcam 19' )
Warh ( © 2003 col. DV 8') VIDEO
La Camera Chiara ( © 2003 b/w-col. DV 8' )
Astrolìte ( © 2002 b/w-col. miniDV 40' )
Mi chiamo Sabino ( © 2001 b/w-col. miniDV 11' )
Le cose vere ( © 2001 b/w-col. miniDV 28' )
Dance purge ( © 2000 b/w-col. DV 9' )
The Fable ( © 2000 b/w-col. DV 9' )

References

External links 
official website
extended biography
up-to-date bibliography
Film Italia Filmographies
Rai Tre
Bibliobit
Tesionline
contribution1: Teknemedia
contribution2: Undonet
contribution3: Nybramedia

1962 births
Living people
Italian contemporary artists
Italian film directors
Italian installation artists